Zamir Ali Badayuni (sometimes spelled Badayooni or Badaiyuni; 20 June 1941 - 20 October 2003) was an Indian-Pakistani critic and broadcaster on the Karachi literary scene. He worked at the Pakistan Broadcasting Corporation with Saleem Ahmed and Qamar Jameel. Badayuni wrote two books: the first, Jadeediyet aur mabaad jadeediyet, focused on modern philosophy and literary criticism and won the Baba-e-Urdu Award from the Pakistan Academy of Letters; and the second, Ma bad jadeediyet ka doosra rukh, focused on postmodernism and won theh Abdul Haq Award from Adbiat Pakistan.

Badayuni was born 20 June 1941 in Badayun, UP, India, the son of Yaqoob Ali, and received his early education in Bombay before migrating to Pakistan. He died in Karachi on 20 October 2003.

References

1941 births
2003 deaths
Muhajir people
Pakistani male writers
Pakistani literary critics
20th-century Pakistani writers
20th-century male writers
People from Budaun